Om Sterling Global University is a private university located in  Hisar, Haryana, India.

Accreditation and affiliation 
source:
 Recognition by Department of Higher Education (Govt. of Haryana)
 Recognition by University Grants Commission (UGC)
 Approved by All India Council for Technical Education (AICTE)
 Approved by Indian Association of Physiotherapist
 Approved by Council of Architecture (COA) - B.Arch.
 Approved by Council of Architecture (COA) - M.Arch.
 Approved by Pharmacy Council of India (PCI)
 Approved by Bar Council of India (BCI)
 MoU signed between Om Sterling Global University and ICAR-NRCL Indian Council for Agriculture Research National Research Centre on Litchi Muzaffarpur, Bihar

Programmes  
source:
 Engineering and Technology
 Commerce and Management
 Architecture & Planning
 Pharmaceutical Sciences
 Legal Studies
 Applied Sciences
 Agriculture
 Social Sciences and Humanities
 Health Sciences
 Hospitality Management
 Yoga and Naturopathy
 Media & Mass Communication
 Vocational Studies
 Fine Arts

References

External links

Education in Haryana